The SS Gaetano Donizetti was an ex-Italian merchant motorship, captured by Nazi Germany for war use thus destroyed by HMS Eclipse on 23 September 23, 1943 in the eastern Aegean Sea, taking to the bottom its munitions and killing 1,800 people on board: 1,576 Italian prisoners of war significantly overcrowded aboard, 220 German guards and a small crew.

Background 
On September 8, 1943 the Armistice between Italy and Allied armed forces was signed.
The Germans had expected and anticipated the Italian surrender, and immediately launched Operation Achse to disarm the Italian Army and take over their annexed lands. The Dodecanese islands had been Italian-occupied since the Italo-Turkish War of 1912. German forces under Generalleutnant Ulrich Kleemann rushed to the central island of Rhodes, and attacked the 40,000-strong Italian garrison on 9 September, and forced it to surrender by 11 September. In doing so, they outmaneuvered the British, which had hoped by their Dodecanese Campaign to control the islands as bases against the German-controlled Balkans. 

The Germans had to hold off the British and wanted to get rid of the numerous Italian prisoners as soon as possible. The Nazis deemed the Italians who chose not to fight further alongside them (the majority), not as prisoners of war, but as traitors to be sent to Germany. These Italian military internees faced forced labor.

The disaster 

The Italian motor vessel Gaetano Donizetti of 3428 tons, had been confiscated by the Germans to bring arms to Rhodes, where she arrived on 19 September. The Germans then stowed some 1,600 prisoners in the cargo hold, where there was reasonably only room for 700.
The Gaetano Donizetti set sail on September 22. The Gaetano Donizetti was escorted by the German torpedo boat  under Oberleutnant Jobst Hahndorff. This was the former French torpedo boat La Pomone and later the Italian FR 42.
 
Around 01:10 am of September 23, the convoy was detected by HMS Eclipse under Commander E. Mack, who immediately opened fire. The overcrowded Gaetano Donizetti went down in seconds, taking with her the entire German crew and all Italian prisoners. The German torpedo boat TA10 was heavily damaged and later towed back to Rhodes, where it was scuttled a few days later. HMS Eclipse left the scene, not realising the extent of the tragedy that had just happened.

Almost all sources agreed that Gaetano Donizetti sank with all hands, though there is an Italian report claiming that at least 32 survivors were rescued by a British destroyer. No official British records confirm this story. 

On February 12, 1944, another transport ship leaving Rhodes, the SS Oria, sank in a storm, causing the death of some 4,000 Italian prisoners of war.

References

Sources 
Wrecksite, Gaetano Donizetti (+1943)
Le grandi tragedie de Egeo  
Chronik des Seekrieges 1939–1945, Württembergische Landesbibliothek, (in German) entry on September 1943

Maritime incidents in September 1943
Merchant ships of Italy
World War II shipwrecks in the Aegean Sea
Captured ships
Troop ships of Germany